Venta may refer to:

Architecture
Venta (establishment), a Spanish typical inn generally located in unpopulated and remote rural areas.

Places
Venta (river), a river in Lithuania and Latvia
Venta (city), a city in Lithuania
Venta (village), a village in Lithuania
Venta (catamaran), a 1973 Latvian catamaran
Venta, Common Brittonic for "market" or "town" in Iron Age Britain, used particularly for:
Venta Belgarum (Venta of the Belgae), the Roman town of Winchester in England
Venta Icenorum (Venta of the Iceni), the Roman town of Caistor St Edmund in England
Venta Silurum (Venta of the Silures), the Roman town of Caerwent in Wales

People
Javi Venta (born 1975), Spanish footballer
Krishna Venta (1911–1958), American cult leader

See also 
 La Venta (disambiguation)